Jock Rock, Volume 2 is the second album in the Jock Rock compilation album series, released in 1995.

Track listing
"Sirius" – The Alan Parsons Project
"En Fuego" – Dan Patrick
"The Final Countdown" – Europe
"Rock and Roll All Nite" – Kiss
"Respect" – Aretha Franklin
"Wooly Bully" – Sam the Sham and the Pharaohs
"The Homecoming Game"
"Hold On! I'm Comin'" – Sam & Dave
"Low Rider" – War
"The Addams Family Theme" – Ray Castoldi
"Great Balls of Fire" – Jerry Lee Lewis
"Get Ready" – Rare Earth
"The Stadium Beat"	
"I Want You Back" – The Jackson 5
"He Could Go All The Way!" – Chris Berman
"Nobody but Me" – The Human Beinz
"Cool Jerk" – The Capitols
"William Tell Overture" – Ray Castoldi
"Devil With The Blue Dress On/Good Golly Miss Molly" – Mitch Ryder & The Detroit Wheels
"The 300 Game"
"Twist & Shout" – The Isley Brothers
"Louie Louie" – The Kingsmen
"We Are the Champions – Queen

Charts

Jock series
Dance music compilation albums
1995 compilation albums
Pop compilation albums
Rock compilation albums
Tommy Boy Records compilation albums